Salvador Capitano (born 1 January 1955 in Rosario) is an Argentinean former soccer player. He is currently a coach.



Honours 
Coach

Emelec
Torneo Apertura- 1992
Copa Saeta Internacional- 1992
Torneo Apertura- 1993
Serie A- 1993
Copa del Pacifico- 1993
Barcelona SC
Torneo Apertura- 1995
Serie A- 1995
Torneo Apertura- 2002

References

1955 births
Living people
Footballers from Rosario, Santa Fe
Argentine people of Italian descent
Argentine footballers
Argentine expatriate footballers
Newell's Old Boys footballers
Palermo F.C. players
Expatriate footballers in Italy
Expatriate football managers in Chile
Expatriate football managers in Colombia
Expatriate football managers in Ecuador
Expatriate football managers in Mexico
Expatriate football managers in Uruguay
Argentine expatriate sportspeople in Chile
Argentine expatriate sportspeople in Colombia
Argentine expatriate sportspeople in Ecuador
Argentine expatriate sportspeople in Mexico
Argentine expatriate sportspeople in Uruguay
Argentine football managers
Club Universitario de Deportes managers
Universidad de Chile managers
Chilean Primera División managers
Barcelona S.C. managers
Talleres de Córdoba managers
Montevideo Wanderers managers
Aldosivi managers
Chiapas F.C. managers
C.S. Emelec managers
Association football defenders
Argentine expatriate sportspeople in Italy